The Nobel Sustainability Trust (NST) is a charity set up by some members of the Swedish Nobel family, i.e. descendants of Ludvig Nobel. Its founders are Michael Nobel, Gustaf Nobel, Philip Nobel, and Peter Nobel serves as a senior adviser. The trust has announced its intention to give its own award.

The former Chairman of the Nobel sustainability Trust is Gustaf Nobel.

Michael Nobel Energy Award 

The Michael Nobel Energy Award is a proposed award, to be awarded to "scientists and/or institutions who have made important discoveries in the renewable energy field or whose discoveries could lead to reduction in pollution and global warming". It will be the first new Nobel prize to be established by the Nobel family since Alfred Nobel established his prizes in 1895 (they were first awarded six years later).

References

Nobel family
Charities based in Sweden
Charitable trusts